"Bug a Boo" is a song recorded by American group Destiny's Child for their second studio album The Writing's on the Wall (1999). It was written by band members Beyoncé Knowles, LeToya Luckett, LaTavia Roberson and Kelly Rowland along with Kandi Burruss and Kevin "She'kspere" Briggs, featuring production by the latter. The song uses interpolations of the 1978 song "Child's Anthem" by Toto.

"Bug a Boo" was released as the second single from The Writing's on the Wall on July 7, 1999 by Columbia Records. It peaked at number 33 on the US Billboard Hot 100, and within the top ten in the Netherlands and the United Kingdom. In Australia, the song was released as the album's fourth and final single in 2000, and the song reached #26 there.

Background 
"Bug a Boo" is the another song that Kandi Burruss and She'kspere worked with Destiny's Child with for their second album. When Burruss and Briggs were brainstorming song ideas to the group, "Bug a Boo" was one of the first songs to be discussed and created. The group initially did not like it as Burruss stated that they were unsure on how they could sing over the track as it seemed like an instrumental that you would rap over.

Commercial performance
"Bug a Boo" debuted at number 87 on the US Billboard Hot 100 on September 25, 1999, and ascended to number 33 before descending down the chart. It spent a total of 20 weeks on the chart. Following the huge success of "Bills, Bills, Bills", "Bug a Boo" was a commercial disappointment. It performed better on the Hot R&B/Hip-Hop Songs, reaching number 15, but remains one of only three Destiny's Child's singles not to reach the top ten on the chart. The Refugee Camp Remix version of the song refers to its commercial failure, with the opening lyrics saying the group was doing "it right the second time".

Internationally, "Bug a Boo" peaked at number 26 in Australia. In the Netherlands, the song peaked at number six on the Dutch Single Top 100, spending 15 weeks on the chart.

Music video
Despite not being a big chart hit, the song's music video was very popular, receiving much airplay from both MTV and BET music networks. It was also Destiny's Child first to chart on the popular TRL Top 10 countdown and the last music video to feature former members LaTavia Roberson and LeToya Luckett. The video was directed by Darren Grant in July 1999.

In the video the group are walking down a shopping boulevard. Four men driving a red car who seem to be trying to attract their attention then approach them but the girls of Destiny's Child don't seem very interested as the men are "bugging" them. In another shot the girls trying to escape the men accidentally run into a men's locker room where they see basketball star Kobe Bryant getting ready for a game. In the next shot the group are wearing cheerleader outfits doing a routine cheer with Wyclef Jean as bandleader. The marching band in the video were actual members of the UCLA Marching Band. Wyclef Jean is also seen clearly wearing the UCLA Drum Major uniform. The final shot shows the group back on the boulevard and fed up with hiding from the unwanted attention from the men in the car they give in and jump in the car and all drive off.

The music video for "Bug a Boo" premiered on BET the week ending September 12, 1999. It later made its debut on MTV the following week ending September 19, 1999.

In the remix version of the video all the sequences are the same except in the shot where Wyclef is seen as the band leader. The remix then starts to play as the band, the cheerleaders, and even the players start to dance. The next shot shows the girls at a party salsa dancing with male partners while Wyclef raps. The video then finishes with the group back on the boulevard and fed up with hiding from the unwanted attention from the men in the car they give in and jump in the car and all drive off.

The original music video is featured on the video compilation The Platinum's on the Wall, whereas the video for the "Refugee Camp Remix" was never released to any disc, but could be later found on YouTube in low quality.

Beyoncé's gold two piece outfit from the shoot is on display at the Hard Rock Cafe restaurant in San Francisco, California.

Track listings

European Maxi CD
 "Bug a Boo" (album version) – 3:31
 "Bug a Boo" (Refugee Camp Remix) (featuring Wyclef Jean)1 – 4:02
 "Bug a Boo" (Maurice's Xclusive "Bug A Boo" Dub Mix)2 – 8:08
 "Bug a Boo" (Maurice's Bug A Dub Mix)2 – 7:14

US promo 12" vinyl
Side A
 "Bug a Boo" (Maurice's Xclusive "Bug a Boo" Club Mix)2 – 8:08
 "Bug a Boo" (Refugee Camp Remix) (featuring Wyclef Jean)1 – 4:02
Side B
 "Bug a Boo" (Maurice's "Bug a Boo" Dub Mix)2 – 7:14
 "Bug a Boo" (album version) – 3:31
 "Bug a Boo" (Maurice's Xclusive "Bug a Boo" Club Mix a cappella)2 – 5:58

UK promo single
 "Bug a Boo" (album version) – 3:31

UK Maxi CD Part 1 CA 668188 2
 "Bug a Boo" (album version) – 3:31
 "So Good" (album version) – 3:14
 "Bills, Bills, Bills" (album version) – 4:16
 "Bills, Bills, Bills" (music video)

UK Maxi CD Part 2 with Poster CA 668188 5
 "Bug a Boo" (album version) – 3:31
 "Bug a Boo" (Refugee Camp Remix) (featuring Wyclef Jean)1 – 4:02
 "Bug a Boo" (Maurice's Xclusive "Bug A Boo" Club Mix)2 – 6:59

European Maxi CD COL 667779 5
 "Bug a Boo" (album version) – 3:31
 "Bug a Boo" (Maurice's Xclusive "Bug a Boo" Club Mix)2 – 8:08
 "Bug a Boo" (Maurice's "Bug a Boo" Dub Mix)2 – 7:14
 "Bug a Boo" (Gentleman's Revenge) (featuring Gentleman) – 3:55

European 2-track single
German promo SAMPCS 1510
 "Bug a Boo" (album version) – 3:31
 "Bug a Boo" (Refugee Camp Remix) (featuring Wyclef Jean)1 – 4:02

Australian Maxi CD Part 1
 "Bug a Boo" (album version) – 3:31
 "Bug a Boo" (Maurice's Xclusive "Bug a Boo" Club Mix)2 – 8:09
 "Bug a Boo" (Maurice's "Bug a Boo" Dub Mix)2 – 7:14
 "Bug a Boo" (a cappella) – 3:13

Australian Maxi CD Part 2 
 "Bug a Boo" (album version) – 3:31
 "Jumpin', Jumpin'" (So So Def Remix) (featuring Da Brat, Jermaine Dupri, & Lil' Bow Wow) - 3:45
 "Jumpin', Jumpin'" (Azza's Radio Mix) - 4:10
 "Jumpin', Jumpin'" (Maurice's Radio Mix) - 4:05

Notes
1 The "Refugee Camp Remix" is a re-recorded hip-hop version of the single.
2 The "Maurice" Remixes contain additional re-recorded vocals (ad-libs) by Beyoncé, arranged by Maurice Joshua.

Charts

Weekly charts

Year-end charts

Certifications

Release history

References

1999 singles
1998 songs
Columbia Records singles
Destiny's Child songs
Music videos directed by Darren Grant
Songs written by Beyoncé
Songs written by Kandi Burruss
Songs written by Kelly Rowland
Songs written by Kevin "She'kspere" Briggs
Songs written by LaTavia Roberson
Songs written by LeToya Luckett
Toto (band)
Songs about stalking